Colonial commodity fiat was the process whereby a colonising European power would define an arbitrary price for natural resources. This process diminished the colonised nation's natural capital. 

History of international trade
Commodity Fiat
Pricing
Natural resources